David Poole Anderson (May 6, 1929 – October 4, 2018) was an American sportswriter based in New York City. In 1981 he won a Pulitzer Prize for distinguished commentary on sporting events. He was the author of 21 books and more than 350 magazine articles.

Early life and career
Anderson was born on May 6, 1929, in Troy, New York. His father was the advertising director of The Troy Times, which his grandfather published. He grew up in Bay Ridge, Brooklyn and graduated from Xavier High School, an elite Jesuit preparatory school in New York City, in 1947.

Anderson's first job in the newspaper industry was at the age of 16 as a messenger for The Sun, where his father then worked in advertising sales. He then attended the College of the Holy Cross in Massachusetts, graduating in 1951. Anderson wrote for a number of New York papers. He covered the Brooklyn Dodgers for the Brooklyn Eagle from 1953, before moving to the New York Journal-American in 1955. In 1965, he won the E.P. Dutton Award for the best magazine sports story for "The Longest Day of Sugar Ray," which appeared in True magazine. He also received the Dick McCann Memorial Award from the Pro Football Hall of Fame for career excellence covering football.

New York Times 
Anderson moved to The New York Times in 1966 and was given a regular column there in 1971. In 1972, he won the E.P. Dutton Award for the best sports feature story of the year, the return of the heavyweight champion Joe Frazier to his Beaufort, South Carolina hometown (he won a Page One Award for the same story). He collaborated on a book, Always on the Run, with Miami Dolphin football players Larry Csonka and Jim Kiick that was published in 1973. It would be one of 21 books he wrote or co-wrote in his career. In 1974, Anderson won the Nat Fleischer Award for excellence in boxing journalism.

In 1981, he became the second sportswriter to win the Pulitzer Prize for Commentary. His Pulitzer citation particularly noted his work on six columns he wrote in 1980, especially one entitled The Food On a Table At the Execution describing the sacking of New York Yankees manager Dick Howser by owner George Steinbrenner. He was inducted into the National Sportscasters and Sportswriters Hall of Fame in Salisbury, North Carolina in 1990, joining three other past "Sports of The Times," columnists — Red Smith, Arthur Daley and John Kieran. Anderson was the 1994 winner of the Associated Press Sports Editors (APSE) Red Smith Award for distinguished sports column writing. In 2005, he received the Dick Schaap Award for Outstanding Journalism. Anderson was inducted in the International Boxing Hall of Fame in 2006. Anderson retired from The Times in 2007, though he continued to contribute occasional columns, his last being an August 2017 article on the US Tennis Open.

In 2014, he was honored with the PEN/ESPN Lifetime Achievement Award for Literary Sports Writing.

Personal life 
Anderson resided in Tenafly, New Jersey. His wife, Maureen, died in 2014; they had three children, one of whom, Steve, was an ESPN vice president. Anderson died on October 4, 2018, at the age of 89 at an assisted living center in Cresskill, New Jersey.

References

External links

1929 births
2018 deaths
American male non-fiction writers
College of the Holy Cross alumni
Dick McCann Memorial Award recipients
The New York Times columnists
The New York Times sportswriters
People from Tenafly, New Jersey
Writers from Troy, New York
Pulitzer Prize for Commentary winners
Red Smith Award recipients
Xavier High School (New York City) alumni
Sportswriters from New York (state)
People from Bay Ridge, Brooklyn